Darryl Morsell (born February 18, 1999) is an American professional basketball player for the Raptors 905 of the NBA G League. He played college basketball for the Marquette Golden Eagles of the Big East Conference. He also played for the Maryland Terrapins.

High school career
Morsell attended Mount Saint Joseph High School in Baltimore, Maryland, where he played basketball with his future college teammate Jalen Smith. As a junior, he averaged 10.6 points and 5.1 rebounds per game. In his senior season, he led his team to Baltimore Catholic League and Maryland Interscholastic Athletic Association A Conference titles. A consensus four-star recruit, he committed to playing college basketball for Maryland over an offer from Notre Dame.

College career
As a freshman at Maryland, Morsell averaged 8.7 points, 4.4 rebounds and two assists per game. He averaged 8.5 points and 3.1 rebounds per game in his sophomore season. As a junior, Morsell averaged 8.5 points, 4.7 rebounds and 2.1 assists per game, helping Maryland win a share of the Big Ten regular season title. He was selected to the All-Big Ten honorable mention by the media. In January 2021, Morsell was sidelined for one week with a facial fracture that required surgery. On January 10, 2021, he scored a season-high 19 points in a 66–63 upset win over 12th-ranked Illinois. As a senior, Morsell averaged nine points, four rebounds and 2.8 assists per game. He was named Big Ten Defensive Player of the Year and collected All-Big Ten honorable mention from the media for a second straight year. On April 5, 2021, Morsell declared for the 2021 NBA draft while maintaining his college eligibility and entered the transfer portal. 

On June 28, 2021, Morsell transferred to Marquette. On November 12, he scored a career-high 26 points in a 75-70 victory over New Hampshire. Morsell was an Honorable Mention All-Big East selection.

Professional career

Salt Lake City Stars (2022)
On October 23, 2022, Morsell joined the Salt Lake City Stars training camp roster.

Raptors 905 (2022–present)
On December 15, 2022, Morsell was traded to the Raptors 905.

Career statistics

College

|-
| style="text-align:left;"| 2017–18
| style="text-align:left;"| Maryland
| 32 || 21 || 28.8 || .424 || .120 || .727 || 4.4 || 2.0 || .6 || .5 || 8.7
|-
| style="text-align:left;"| 2018–19
| style="text-align:left;"| Maryland
| 33 || 31 || 26.7 || .459 || .290 || .672 || 3.1 || 1.8 || .7 || .5 || 8.5
|-
| style="text-align:left;"| 2019–20
| style="text-align:left;"| Maryland
| 31 || 29 || 27.6 || .431 || .333 || .756 || 4.7 || 2.1 || .8 || .3 || 8.5
|-
| style="text-align:left;"| 2020–21
| style="text-align:left;"| Maryland
| 30 || 27 || 29.4 || .486 || .255 || .609 || 4.0 || 2.8 || .9 || .6 || 9.0
|-
|style="text-align:left;"| 2021–22
| style="text-align:left;"|  Marquette
| 31 || 31 || 29.7 || .446 || .347 || .771 || 4.0 || 2.5 || 1.2 || .4 || 13.4
|- class="sortbottom"
| style="text-align:center;" colspan="2"| Career
| 157 || 139 || 28.4 || .449 || .299 || .717 || 4.0 || 2.2 || .8 || .4 || 9.6

Personal life
Morsell is the son of Duane and Carolyn Morsell. His older brother, Terrell, died at age 10, two weeks after collapsing during a basketball scrimmage due to a heart issue. Morsell subsequently underwent surgery for a less severe heart issue.

References

External links
Marquette Golden Eagles bio
Maryland Terrapins bio

1999 births
Living people
American expatriate basketball people in Canada
American men's basketball players
Basketball players from Baltimore
Marquette Golden Eagles men's basketball players
Maryland Terrapins men's basketball players
Raptors 905 players
Salt Lake City Stars players
Shooting guards